Secrets of the Masters is a 2009 Philippine television cooking show broadcast by Q. Hosted by Issa Litton, it premiered in 2009.

2009 Philippine television series debuts
Filipino-language television shows
Philippine cooking television series
Q (TV network) original programming